Mecistops is a genus of crocodiles, the slender-snouted crocodiles, native to sub-Saharan Africa.

Taxonomy and etymology
Traditionally placed in Crocodylus, recent studies in DNA and morphology have shown that it is in fact basal to Crocodylus,  thus was moved its own genus. This genus itself was long considered to contain only one species, M. cataphractus, but recent genetic analysis has revealed the existence of two species: the West African slender-snouted crocodile (M. cataphractus) and the Central African slender-snouted crocodile (M. leptorhynchus). Both species diverged during the Miocene (about 6.5–7.5 million years ago) and are separated by the Cameroon Volcanic Line.

Phylogeny
The cladogram below is based on two studies that combined morphological and molecular (DNA sequencing) data. 
(Note that most morphological analyses find a closer relationship between Euthecodon and Brochuchus.)

Alternatively, other morphological studies have recovered Mecistops as a basal member of Crocodylinae, more closely related to Crocodylus than to Osteolaemus and the other members of Osteolaeminae, as shown in the cladogram below.

Extant Species

Etymology
The genus name Mecistops is most probably derived from the Ancient Greek words μήκιστ (mēkist) meaning "longest" and ὄψις (ópsis) meaning "aspect" or "appearance" or ὄψ (óps) meaning 'face'.

Description 
Slender-snouted crocodiles are native to freshwater habitats in central and western Africa. They prefer highly vegetated bodies of water to hide from prey and potential predators. They are medium-sized crocodiles, typically slightly smaller than the Nile crocodile, but are larger than several other species of crocodilians. Males are significantly larger than females. They have a slender snout used for catching prey, hence their name. They are incredibly shy and adversely impacted by human disturbance.

Behavior 

The diet of the slender-snouted crocodile consists mainly of fish, amphibians, and crustaceans. Typically, they can be found basking on land. Adults occasionally take smaller mammals, aquatic snakes, turtles, and birds. Both species in the genus are not typically found in groups, except during the onset of the breeding season. The female constructs a mound nest consisting mainly of plant matter. The nests are usually 50 to 60 cm high and 1 to 2 m in diameter. Nests are placed on the banks of rivers, and construction generally begins at the onset of the wet season, although breeding is asynchronous even within members of one population. It has a similar, but generally shorter nesting season than that of the sympatric dwarf crocodile, which may nest further from the riverine habitat frequented by Mecistops. The breeding season begins in January or February and lasts until July.

Slender-snouted crocodiles lay an average of 16 (minimum 13, maximum 27) very large eggs (relative to body size) about a week after completion of the mound nest. The nests are constructed out of decaying vegetation. The incubation period is long compared with most other crocodilian genera, sometimes lasting over 110 days. The average incubation for female offspring is 90 to 100 days and for males is usually 85 to 86 days. The female remains close to the nest, but does not defend it with the same vigor as some other crocodilians. Once the eggs begin to hatch, and the juveniles emit their characteristic chirping, she breaks open the nest and assists in the hatching process. Hatchlings then disperse across the flooded forest floor. Although losses from predators do occur (e.g. by soft-shelled turtles), they apparently are minimal, possibly accounting for the small number of relatively large eggs laid, and the long incubation period. The sex of the eggs is determined by temperature. Females are produced between 28 and 31 °C. Males are produced between 31 and 33 °C. The maximum temperature that the eggs are able to withstand is 34 °C and produce females. Sex is determined between day 14 and 21. The mothers help the offspring hatch if they can not do so themselves. Hatchlings are precocious and mimic a smaller version of the parents. They also have very sharp teeth for protection.

This genus has good hearing, eyesight, and smell. Throughout the body of crocodiles, sensory pits are present, which have nerve terminals inside. The two types of these sensory pits are integumentary sense organs that cover the body and papillae that cover the head, primarily around the snout. When under water, crocodile have a “third eyelid” called a nictitating membrane, which is present in many other reptiles, but is unique in crocodiles because it is semitransparent and acts as goggles to improve eyesight when hunting and prevents eye damage. Crocodiles are able to make certain sounds, especially juveniles. Hatchling crocodiles are able to indicate when they will hatch by making a vocalization that can be heard by the mother. Crocodiles can make coughing, hissing, and bellowing vocalizations usually when feeling threatened.

Conservation 
Both species in the genus have been studied very little, in part due to their remote habitat. However, M. cataphractus (when it contained both the West African and Central African populations) has been classified as critically endangered by the IUCN. Threats include hunting (skin and bushmeat), habitat loss, overfishing (they mainly feed on fish), and general disturbance. Both species have been entirely extirpated from several countries where formerly present, and have declined elsewhere. However, the Central African species retains a relatively robust population, especially in Gabon. There is considerable uncertainty about the size of the wild population, but it is estimated that between 1,000 and 20,000 remain. Slender-snouted crocodiles are kept and bred at a number of zoos in Europe and North America, and the Ivory Coast has started a captive-breeding program.

References 

Crocodylidae
Reptile genera
Miocene animals of Africa
Miocene crocodylomorphs
Taxa named by John Edward Gray
Extant Miocene first appearances